The 2010–11 season was Associazione Calcio Milan's 77th season in Serie A, and their 28th consecutive season in the top flight of Italian football. It was the first season under new head coach Massimiliano Allegri, who replaced Leonardo, and with new shirt sponsors Fly Emirates, after four seasons with Bwin.

Milan secured their 18th Serie A title – their first since 2003–04 – following a goalless draw away against Roma on 7 May. The club also competed in the Champions League, being knocked out by Tottenham Hotspur in the round of 16, and took part in the Coppa Italia, being eliminated by Palermo in the semi-finals.

Pre-season and friendlies

For the second-straight year, Milan opened their pre-season by taking on Varese in an away game, on 25 July. Unlike the previous year, however, they suffered a 2–0 defeat, with first-half goals from Daniele Buzzegoli and Marco Cellini.

As part of the Emirates Cup, Milan then played two friendlies against Arsenal and Lyon at the Emirates Stadium, London, on 31 July and 1 August respectively. Both games finished 1–1. Alexandre Pato headed an equalizer late in the second half against Arsenal, after the English club had gone ahead through Marouane Chamakh. Meanwhile, Marco Borriello opened the scoring against Lyon before Jimmy Briand tied the game with 12 minutes to play. The tournament was eventually won by Arsenal.

The Rossoneri later traveled to the United States to face Greek side Panathinaikos in Detroit on 6 August. The first 90 minutes ended in a scoreless draw, though early in the second half the Greeks had a goal disallowed despite the ball having crossed the line. Without extra time, the game went straight to penalties where Milan won 5–3, with Daniele Bonera converting the deciding spot-kick.

Following the club's return to Italy, on 13 August, they took part in the TIM Trophy, held in Bari, along with Internazionale and Juventus. In the first of two 45-minute matches, Milan faced Juventus, who had previously been defeated by Inter; Ronaldinho opened the scoring in the 20th minute, but Juventus later equalized through Diego, setting the final score at 1–1. Penalties were taken to assign one extra point for the tournament standings and Milan won 4–2, as goalkeeper Marco Amelia completed two saves. The second and deciding game against Inter finished in a goalless draw, again forcing penalties. Misfires by Mathieu Flamini, Filippo Inzaghi and Ronaldinho resulted in a 3–2 loss, and the trophy was awarded to Inter.

Juventus were also Milan's opponents in the annual Trofeo Luigi Berlusconi, held at the San Siro on 22 August. The match finished scoreless after 90 minutes and the winners had to be decided by penalties. Juventus won on penalties 5–4, as Thiago Silva was the only player to miss from the spot.

Milan concluded their pre-season on 25 August, taking on Barcelona in the 45th edition of the Joan Gamper Trophy. After a goalless first half, David Villa opened the scoring for Barcelona only two minutes into the second half. Inzaghi equalized in the 67th minute with a volley off a cross by Clarence Seedorf, setting the final score to 1–1 and sending the game to penalties, which Barcelona won 3–1 to lift the trophy.

During the league winter break, Milan traveled to Dubai where they resumed their trainings and played a friendly match against local club Al-Ahli on 2 January 2011. The match ended 2–1 for the Rossoneri, who opened the scoring through Clarence Seedorf late in the first half, and then doubled their lead through youth team striker Giacomo Beretta in the 73rd minute, before the hosts pulled one back with a 25-yard strike by Hasan Ali.

Serie A

The fixtures for the current Serie A season were announced by the Serie A on 28 July. Milan began their league campaign by cruising past newly promoted Lecce at the San Siro on Sunday, 29 August. The Rossoneri took the lead after 16 minutes with an angled drive by Alexandre Pato. Soon after, Thiago Silva scrambled home a corner, before Pato grabbed his second goal of the night, setting the score to 3–0 by the 28th minute. There was little action in the second half until shortly before the final whistle, when Filippo Inzaghi made it 4–0. After the first round of league games, Milan topped the table on goal difference.

After a two-week break for international play, Milan traveled to the Stadio Dino Manuzzi to face another newly promoted team, Cesena. The match was much anticipated, as it would feature the debut of new signings Zlatan Ibrahimović and Robinho. It turned out to be a disappointing night for the Rossoneri, however, who lost 2–0. After missing a couple of early chances with Ronaldinho and Thiago Silva and having a goal disallowed for offside, they went behind in the 31st minute, as Erjon Bogdani headed in a cross from Ezequiel Schelotto. One minute before half-time, Cesena doubled their lead through Emanuele Giaccherini on a fast paced counter-attack. Milan had another goal called off early in the second half, this time for handball, but in the end were unable to score, with Ibrahimović missing a penalty in the late stages of the game.

Only three days after defeating Auxerre in Champions League, Milan took on Catania at the San Siro. The Sicilians opened the scoring in the 27th minute through Ciro Capuano, who fired a 30-yard strike past Christian Abbiati. Moments before the interval, Milan equalised with a goal from Filippo Inzaghi. After a scoreless second half, the game ended in a 1–1 draw. It went no better on the following Wednesday, as Milan recorded another 1–1 draw in a mid-week game against Lazio. The Rossoneri went ahead in the 66th minute thanks to Ibrahimović. Clarence Seedorf played a long through-ball to the Swede, who dribbled goalkeeper Fernando Muslera and scored. The hosts equalised with nine minutes to play through a first-time shot by Sergio Floccari on Hernanes' cross. In the last minutes, both teams missed the chance to claim the victory: Gianluca Zambrotta hit the crossbar with a powerful strike from just outside the box, while Hernanes was denied by a save from Abbiati.

Milan returned to winning ways by defeating Genoa 1–0 at home on Saturday, 25 September. The lone goal was scored by Ibrahimović in the 49th minute. The Swede striker chased a long ball by Andrea Pirlo and managed to stuck his leg between defenders Dario Dainelli and Andrea Ranocchia to kick the ball over the head of goalkeeper Eduardo, who only managed to palm it into the net. Milan repeated themselves the following Saturday, beating Parma, to get their first away victory of the season. The only scorer was Pirlo with a 35-yard shot in the 25th minute.

After the second break for internationals of the season, Milan defeated Chievo 3–1 at home on Saturday, 16 October. Pato opened the scoring for the Rossoneri in the 18th minute with a one-time shot off an Ibrahimović cross. The Brazilian scored again twelve minutes later, following a quick free kick by Ibrahimović. In the second half, Chievo pulled one back, as a header from Sergio Pellissier was deflected by Ibrahimović into his own net. Milan's third and final goal was scored by Robinho in stoppage time.

Milan claimed a fourth consecutive win in the league, as they beat Napoli at the San Paolo on Monday, 25 October. The Rossoneri went ahead in the 22nd minute through Robinho, who played a one-two with Massimo Oddo and shot the ball past Napoli goalkeeper Morgan De Sanctis from just inside the penalty area. Zlatan Ibrahimović headed in a cross by Oddo to double the lead in the 71st minute. With 12 minutes to play, Napoli pulled one back through Ezequiel Lavezzi, but Milan managed to resist and eventually won 2–1.

Milan's winning streak came to an end on Saturday, 30 October, when they played host to Juventus and were defeated 2–1. The Rossoneri had a good start, but failed to score: Zlatan Ibrahimović hit the crossbar with a 25-yard shot in the seventh minute, while Pato was called offside moments later when he was one-on-one with the goalkeeper. The visitors then took lead in the 24th minute through Fabio Quagliarella, who headed in a cross from Paolo De Ceglie. Despite Milan's efforts to equalise, Juventus doubled their lead midway in the second half through Alessandro Del Piero. Eight minutes before the end, Ibrahimović scored Milan's lone goal of the evening, a header off Luca Antonini's cross, which could not prevent the loss.

Four days after drawing against Real Madrid in the Champions League, Milan traveled to the San Nicola to take on Bari. The Rossoneri quickly went ahead, as Massimo Ambrosini headed in a cross by Clarence Seedorf in the fourth minute. Shortly after the half-hour mark, Milan doubled their lead through Mathieu Flamini, who received the ball from Zlatan Ibrahimović inside the penalty area and put it past Bari goalkeeper Jean-François Gillet into the net. The hosts pulled one back in the 65th minute with a goal from Vitali Kutuzov, but seven minutes later Pato made it 3–1 following a pass from Seedorf, before a late goal from Barreto set the final score to 3–2. The Rossoneri subsequently claimed a midweek home victory over Palermo. Pato opened the scoring, heading in a corner by Seedorf in the 19th minute. The visitors equalised 18 minutes in the second half through Armin Bačinović, whose 25-yard strike surprised goalkeeper Christian Abbiati. Milan, however, were awarded a penalty in 77th minute, as Palermo 'keeper Salvatore Sirigu brought down Ambrosini. Ibrahimović stepped up and scored for Milan to regain the lead. Seven minutes before time, Robinho made it 3–1 and sealed the win, which meant Milan were back at the top of the table, one point ahead Lazio.

At the following weekend, Milan were to face Internazionale in the first Derby della Madonnina of the season, which the Rossoneri had lost on the last three occasions. Only five minutes into the game, Zlatan Ibrahimović was awarded a penalty for being taken down by Marco Materazzi; Ibrahimović himself converted the spot-kick to put Milan ahead. Despite being left with ten men, as Ignazio Abate was sent off in the 60th minute, Milan managed to maintain the lead and claimed a third straight victory. Milan then played host to Fiorentina on 20 November. A goal from Ibrahimović shortly before half-time was enough for Milan to claim a 1–0 victory. The Swedish striker chested a cross from Thiago Silva inside the penalty area and scored in the bottom right corner with an overhead kick.

After clinching qualification to the knockout stage of the Champions League in mid-week, Milan traveled to Genoa to face Sampdoria on Saturday, 27 November. Despite Milan going ahead shortly before the interval through Robinho, who combined with Ibrahimović and scored from inside the box, the hosts managed to equalise on the hour with a goal by Giampaolo Pazzini, setting the final score to 1–1.

Milan returned to winning ways defeating Brescia 3–0 at home in the first game of December, on the fourth. The Rossoneri took lead four minutes from the kick-off: Zlatan Ibrahimović combined with Massimo Ambrosini on the left wing and sent a low cross into the goal area to Kevin-Prince Boateng, who volleyed the ball in for his first goal since joining the club in August. Shortly before the half-hour mark, Robinho doubled Milan's lead after intercepting a back pass from a Brescia player. Three minutes later, Ibrahimović scored the third and final goal with a powerful strike from just inside the box.

Three days after playing the last match of the Champions League group stage against Ajax, Milan travelled to the Stadio Renato Dall'Ara to face Bologna. The Rossoneri took the lead in the ninth minute with a goal by Boateng, who just like the previous week volleyed into the net a cross from Ibrahimović. Milan doubled their lead ten minutes before half time through Robinho, who beat the goalkeeper following a through-ball by Boateng. Right on the hour mark, Andrea Pirlo played a pin-pointed cross to Ibrahimović, who controlled the ball into the penalty area and scored into the low right corner, sealing Milan's second straight 3–0 win. But in the last match before a three-week winter break, Milan lost 1–0 to Roma at the San Siro, the lone goal being scored by former Rossonero striker Marco Borriello.

The league resumed on Thursday, 6 January; Milan traveled to the Stadio Sant'Elia to take on Cagliari. After a scoreless first half, during which the hosts hit the woodwork once, Milan went on to win the game thanks to the first career goal by 20-year-old Sierra Leonean midfielder Rodney Strasser five minutes before time. New signing Antonio Cassano, at his first official appearance for the club, provided the assist for the goal. Three days later, Milan played host to Udinese at the San Siro. The visitors took the lead in the 35th minute through Antonio Di Natale, who slid the ball into an empty net after Gökhan Inler hit the post; but the Rossoneri equalised in first-half injury time with Pato, who scored following a low cross by Ibrahimović. Udinese regained the lead eight minutes into the second half with a header by Alexis Sánchez and went ahead 3–1 when Di Natale scored his second of the day. Milan, however, pulled one back in the 78th minute, as Mehdi Benatia headed a cross by Thiago Silva into his own net, and equalised four minutes later through Pato, who had been set up by Cassano. With only one minute remaining, Germán Denis put Udinese ahead once again on a counter-attack, but in injury time Cassano set up Ibrahimović to make it 4–4. Despite the draw, Milan topped the table at the halfway mark.

Milan were held to a second straight draw, 1–1 away against Lecce. The Rossoneri took the lead at the beginning of the second half with a 25-yard strike by Ibrahimović, but Rubén Olivera equalised for the host eight minutes before time.

After a victory over Bari in the Coppa Italia round of 16 in mid-week, Milan returned to winning ways in the league too, by defeating Cesena 2–0 at home on 23 January. The Rossoneri took the lead in the last minute of the first half, when Cesena defender Maximiliano Pellegrino slid the ball into his own net while attempting to prevent Ibrahimović from shooting, following a cross by Cassano. The second goal came in injury time, as Robinho played a through-ball to Ibrahimović who put it past the goalkeeper from inside the penalty area.

Three days after knocking Sampdoria out of the Coppa Italia quarter-finals, Milan traveled to Sicily to take on Catania on 29 January. Despite going down to ten men in the second half following Mark van Bommel's ejection, the Rossoneri managed to take the lead two minutes before the hour mark through Robinho, who converted a loose ball after Ibrahimović's free-kick was saved. The hosts then created more scoring opportunities, but did not manage to find an equaliser and instead, five minutes from time, Ibrahimović made it 2–0 and sealed the win. The following Tuesday, Milan were held to a scoreless home draw by Lazio in a mid-week game.

The Rossoneri were forced to another draw on Sunday, 6 February, when they faced Genoa at the Stadio Luigi Ferraris. Milan had taken the lead shortly before the half-hour mark through Pato, who converted a low cross by Ibrahimović, but the hosts equalised in first-half injury time with a goal by Antonio Floro Flores from deep inside the penalty area.

At the following weekend, Milan cruised past Parma at home. The Rossoneri took the lead in the eighth minute through Clarence Seedorf, who dribbled the opponents' goalkeeper following a pass by Ibrahimović. Less than ten minutes later, Antonio Cassano made it 2–0 after a combination with Gennaro Gattuso. In the second half, Robinho, who had just come on, scored Milan's third and fourth goal to seal the win.

After suffering a defeat by Tottenham Hotspur in the Champions League round of 16 in mid-week, Milan managed to snap up a second consecutive league win, a 2–1 away at Chievo on Sunday, 20 February. The Rossoneri opened the scoring in the 25th minute: Ibrahimović headed Antonio Cassano's cross to Robinho, who chested the ball and scored in the bottom corner from inside the goal area. The hosts equalised shortly after the hour mark, as Gélson Fernandes headed in Kévin Constant's cross from ten yards. Milan, however, found the winning goal eight minutes from time, thanks to a solo effort by substitute Pato.

Milan went on to claim a third straight victory over second-placed Napoli at home on Monday, 28 February. After a scoreless first half, the Rossoneri went ahead in the 49th minute, as Ibrahimović converted a penalty awarded for a handball by Salvatore Aronica. Kevin-Prince Boateng doubled Milan's lead in the 77th minute, volleying the ball into the net off Pato's low cross and two minutes later Pato himself sealed the win, making it 3–0 with a strike from outside the box. The victory saw Milan move five points clear of Internazionale at the top of the table, while Napoli dropped to third, one point behind Inter.

The Rossoneri won again the following Saturday, snapping up a 1–0 victory in Turin against Juventus. The lone goal was scored by Gennaro Gattuso midway through the second half, as his left footed attempt from the edge of the penalty area was not held by Juventus goalkeeper Gianluigi Buffon.

After being knocked-out from the Champions League earlier in the week, Milan's four-game winning streak in the league was halted by a 1–1 home draw against Bari on 13 March. The visitors took the lead late in the first half through Gergely Rudolf, following a free-kick by Sergio Almirón. Milan's equaliser in the very first minutes of the second half was called off, due to Robinho being in an offside position. On the hour mark, the Rossoneri had another goal disallowed for handball, as Ibrahimović had controlled the ball with his arm. Later on, Ibrahimović was ejected for hitting Bari defender Marco Rossi. Despite Milan being left to ten men, Antonio Cassano scored the equaliser eight minutes from time, volleying Luca Antonini's cross into the net.

With their top goalscorer Ibrahimović serving the first of a two-game ban, Milan suffered a 1–0 defeat against Palermo at the Stadio Renzo Barbera on 19 March. The hosts' goal was scored by defender Dorin Goian, who chested the ball inside the six-yard box following a corner kick and put it past Milan goalkeeper Christian Abbiati.

The loss against Palermo meant that Milan's gap over cross-city rivals Inter at the top of the table was reduced to two points, before the two side met in the second Derby della Madonnina of the season on Saturday, 2 April. The game got off to a quick start, with Milan taking the lead after only 45 seconds: Gattuso sent a through ball to Robinho and as the Brazilian tried to dribble Inter goalkeeper Júlio César, the ball was deflected towards Pato, who stroked it in. Ten minutes later, the Rossoneri claimed a penalty when a shot by Clarence Seedorf was stopped with an arm by defender Maicon, but the referee let play continue. Shortly before half-time, Inter had a couple of a chance to tie, first with a header by Thiago Motta that was saved by Abbiati, then with Samuel Eto'o, who fired wide from a few yards. Ten minutes into the second half, Inter was left down to ten men, as Cristian Chivu was sent off for a last-man foul. Milan subsequently doubled their lead in the 62nd minute through Pato, who scored his second goal of the night with a header off Ignazio Abate's cross. In the last minute, Milan was awarded a penalty which Antonio Cassano converted, setting the final score to 3–0. Cassano, however, was ejected in injury time after receiving a second yellow card. The win allowed Milan to retain their lead at the top of the Serie A table, three points clear of Napoli and five points clear of Inter, with seven games remaining.

Milan went on to seize a second consecutive victory against Fiorentina in Florence on Sunday, 10 April. The Rossoneri took the lead as soon as the eight-minute, with Seedorf sending into the net a through-ball by Pato. Pato himself then scored Milan's second goal four minutes from half time, after a combination between Ibrahimović and Kevin-Prince Boateng. The hosts pulled one back with 11 minutes to go, when Juan Manuel Vargas's shot from outside the box was deflected into his own net by Gattuso. Despite being left down to ten men, as Ibrahimović was ejected in the 87th minute, Milan managed to hold on and snap up a 2–1 win.

The following weekend, Milan played host to Sampdoria. Despite the visitors having the first big chance of the game, it was Milan who took the lead in the 20th minute, with a 25-yard free-kick by Clarence Seedorf. In the second half, the Rossoneri doubled their lead with a penalty converted by Antonio Cassano, who had replaced an injured Pato shortly before the break. Cassano then also set up Robinho for Milan's third and final goal with less than half an hour to go. As both Napoli and Inter lost their respective games, Milan extended their lead at the top of the table to six points, with five games remaining.

Three days after playing the first leg of the Coppa Italia semi-finals, Milan claimed a fourth-straight win in the league on Saturday, 23 April. The Rossoneri defeated Brescia 1–0 at the Stadio Rigamonti with a late goal by Robinho, despite the hosts creating several dangerous chances throughout the second half. Since second-placed Napoli lost their game that same day and dropped to third behind Inter, Milan's lead was extended to eight points, with four games to play. Milan then seized their fifth win in a row by defeating Bologna 1–0 at home on Sunday, 1 May. The lone goal of the match was scored by Mathieu Flamini in the eighth minute: the Frenchman received a through ball inside the box and after having his first shot saved by the opponent goalkeeper, he managed to score off the rebound.

Milan traveled to the Stadio Olimpico to take on Roma in their third-to-last league game of the season on 7 May. Due to their eight-point lead, a draw would have been enough for the Rossoneri to secure the title. The hosts created more scoring chances in the first half, yet being unable to score. After the break, Milan was more aggressive and had goal opportunities of their own. In particular, Robinho hit the post with a strike from just inside the box and Boateng fired off wide one-on-one against the opponent goalkeeper. The game eventually ended in a scoreless draw, which allowed to secure the 18th Serie A title of their history.

A week later, Milan celebrated the title with a 4–1 win over Cagliari in their last home game of the season. After the match, the Rossoneri were awarded the trophy in front of a capacity crowd. Milan concluded their season with a scoreless draw away at Udinese on Sunday, 22 May.

Coppa Italia

For the 12th season in a row, Milan started the Coppa Italia directly in the round of 16, as one of the eight best seeded teams. They welcomed Bari at the San Siro on Thursday, 20 January. Bari reached the round of 16 after defeating Livorno 4–1 in the Fourth Preliminary Round. Milan, however, easily knocked them out of the competition by sealing a 3–0 win, with goals by Ibrahimović, Alexander Merkel and Robinho.

For the quarter-finals, Milan traveled to Genoa to take on Sampdoria on Wednesday, 26 January. Due to the high number of injuries, head coach Massimiliano Allegri was prompted to put newly arrived duo of Mark van Bommel and Urby Emanuelson in the starting line-up. Milan, however, took only 22 minutes to go ahead 2–0, with both goals being scored by Alexandre Pato. Early in the second half, the hosts pulled one back through Stefano Guberti, but this did not prevent the Rossoneri from winning the game and making it through to the semi-finals, where they will face Palermo.

The semi-finals first leg was played at the San Siro on Wednesday, 20 April. Milan took the lead as soon as the fourth minute with a volley by Ibrahimović off Massimo Oddo's cross. The visitors, however, equalised ten minutes later through Javier Pastore, following a one-two pass with Mauricio Pinilla, and they went ahead 2–1 eight minutes into the second half through Abel Hernández. Less than 15 minutes from time, Urby Emanuelson scored the equaliser for Milan, setting the final score to 2–2.

The second leg was played at the Stadio Renzo Barbera in Palermo on Tuesday, 10 May. Due to the tie in the first-leg, Milan would have needed a win or a 3–3 or higher draw to qualify for the final (while a 2–2 would have sent the game to extra time). After a scoreless first half, Palermo took the lead around the hour mark, with a header by Giulio Migliaccio off a corner kick. Ten minutes later, Milan were left down to ten men, as Van Bommel was ejected for a last man foul, and Cesare Bovo converted the resulting penalty to double the hosts' lead. Bovo himself was ejected too shortly after for a hard tackle on Alexandre Pato. Milan, however, only managed to pull one back through Ibrahimović in injury time and they were knocked-out from the competition.

UEFA Champions League

Group stage
Milan began their UEFA Champions League campaign in the group stage after finishing in third place in the 2009–10 Serie A. Due to their UEFA coefficient, they were seeded in Pot 1 with the eight highest ranked teams. The Rossoneri were drawn in the group G alongside Spanish La Liga runners-up Real Madrid, Dutch Cup winners Ajax and French side Auxerre.

For the opening game, on 15 September, Milan played host to Auxerre at the San Siro. Despite struggling in the first half, with the visitors also hitting the crossbar once, the Rossoneri managed to get a 2–0 win, thanks to two goals by Zlatan Ibrahimović in the 66th and 69th minutes. Two weeks later, Milan traveled to the Amsterdam Arena to face Ajax. The Dutch went ahead in the 23rd minute; Luis Suárez flicked the ball through Alessandro Nesta's legs and passed it to Mounir El Hamdaoui, who stopped the ball inside the goal area, turned around and shot into the net. Shortly after, Robinho missed a good chance for Milan, as he fired wide one-on-one against goalkeeper Maarten Stekelenburg. The Rossoneri, however, managed to equalise eight minutes before half time through Ibrahimović, who chested a one-time pass by Clarence Seedorf and scored. Late in the second half, Milan nearly found the winning goal, but Kevin-Prince Boateng's angled drive was saved by Stekelenburg and the game ended 1–1.

In the third game, on 19 October, Milan suffered a 2–0 defeat against Real Madrid at the Santiago Bernabéu Stadium. The hosts took the lead in the 13th minute with a free-kick by Cristiano Ronaldo and scored again a minute later, as a shot by Mesut Özil was accidentally deflected by Daniele Bonera into his own net. The two sides met again two weeks later at the San Siro and again it was Real Madrid who took the lead, thanks to a goal by Gonzalo Higuaín in the late stages of the first half. Milan, however, managed to equalise through Filippo Inzaghi in the 68th minute. The 37-year-old striker, who had come on eight minutes earlier, headed in a cross by Zlatan Ibrahimović, after the ball was deflected by Real's goalkeeper Iker Casillas. Ten minutes later, Inzaghi scored again on a through ball by Gennaro Gattuso to put Milan ahead. But the Rossoneri were eventually denied victory, as Pedro León made it 2–2 in injury time.

For the fifth game, Milan traveled to France to take on Auxerre on Tuesday, 23 November. After a scoreless first half, Milan went ahead in the 64th minutes through Zlatan Ibrahimović, with a powerful strike from the edge of the penalty area. In injury time, Ronaldinho, who had come on a few minutes earlier, made it 2–0, following a pass from Robinho. With Real Madrid beating Ajax in Amsterdam, Milan secured a spot in the knockout stage of the competition. In the sixth and last game of the group stage two weeks later, Milan suffered a harmless 2–0 home defeat against Ajax, with second half-goals by Demy de Zeeuw and Toby Alderweireld.

Knockout stage
The draw for the first knockout round took place in Nyon, Switzerland, on 17 December 2010. Milan were paired with the winners of Group A, Tottenham Hotspur. The first leg was contested at the San Siro on Tuesday, 15 February. The visitors had a couple of early occasions with Peter Crouch and Rafael van der Vaart, both saved by goalkeeper Christian Abbiati. The latter picked up an injury to his head after colliding with Crouch and had to be replaced by Marco Amelia in the 18th minute. Later on, Milan claimed a penalty, as Michael Dawson hit Zlatan Ibrahimović with his arm inside the box, but the referee allowed play to go on. The Rossoneri made little effort during the first half and shortly before half time Amelia deflected Van der Vaart's shot over the crossbar. At the start of the second half, Milan coach Massimiliano Allegri sent in Alexandre Pato to replace Clarence Seedorf. It was defender Mario Yepes, however, who posed the major threats to Tottenham: the Colombian was twice denied by goalkeeper Heurelho Gomes from goalbound headers. Milan kept pressing forward, but 10 minutes from time they were caught short on a counterattack led by Aaron Lennon, who provided the assist for Crouch's winning goal. In injury time, Ibrahimović had the equaliser disallowed for apparently pushing Dawson and the visitors eventually snapped up a 1–0 victory.

The second leg was played at White Hart Lane on Wednesday, 9 March. Having been defeated in the first-leg, Milan would have needed a win to make it through to the quarter-finals (except a 1–0 win, which would have sent the game to extra time), while a draw would have been enough for Tottenham to qualify. Therefore, despite a quick start by the hosts in the very first minutes, it was Milan who dictated much of the play in the first half and proved to be the more dangerous of the two sides. A 25-yard free-kick by Ibrahimović was saved by Gomes in the 16th minute and 9 minutes later Tottenham almost went 1–0 down when Gomes raced out of his goal to challenge Pato, who managed to fed the ball to Robinho, whose deflected shot was saved on the line by defender William Gallas. The Rossoneri kept creating chances in the second half, yet being unable to score. The game ended in a scoreless draw and Milan were knocked-out from the competition.

Squad statistics
As of 22 May 2011.

1 Player left the club during the season
2 Player joined the club during the January transfer window

Transfers

Milan trod carefully in the early stages of the transfer window, as CEO Adriano Galliani stated that any new signing would only follow a departure. Marco Amelia and Mario Yepes joined the club to replace Dida and Giuseppe Favalli respectively, whose contracts expired. The Rossoneri went on to sign Sokratis Papastathopoulos for an undisclosed fee from Genoa, who also took on co-ownership of youngsters Rodney Strasser, Nnamdi Oduamadi and Gianmarco Zigoni as part of the deal – though only the latter actually left Milan.

After the first couple of pre-season games, head coach Massimiliano Allegri lamented the need of one more midfielder. This led to the purchase of German-Ghanaian Kevin-Prince Boateng on another co-ownership deal with Genoa, who had just signed him from Portsmouth; Genoa also took on co-ownership of Giacomo Beretta as part of the deal, though he remained in Milan's youth team.

As the last week of the transfer window approached, director general Ariedo Braida revealed that Milan might be interested in signing Swedish star Zlatan Ibrahimović from Barcelona. Despite initially claiming that it was nothing more than a "dream", Galliani later confirmed that negotiations were actually taking place. After some days of talks, on 29 August Milan officially announced to have signed Ibrahimović on a free loan with the option to fully purchase the athlete's playing rights for €24 million at the end of the season.

On the last day before the summer transfer deadline, Milan made another major signing, securing Robinho from Manchester City. The move cost €18 million plus bonuses and was hailed by Galliani as "a wonderful gift from owner Silvio Berlusconi". At the same time, three players left the club: Kakha Kaladze and Klaas-Jan Huntelaar moved to Genoa and Schalke 04 respectively, while Marco Borriello was loaned out to Roma.

As the January transfer window approached, Galliani stated that Milan was in talks with Sampdoria to sign striker Antonio Cassano, who was dropped from the squad in October following an argument with Sampdoria president Riccardo Garrone. The move was later confirmed by Milan owner Silvio Berlusconi and Cassano joined the Rossoneri for their winter camp in Dubai on 27 December. His transfer was officially finalized on 3 January, the opening day of the winter transfer window.

Meanwhile, speculation about Ronaldinho leaving the club increased. These rumors were confirmed by Ronaldinho himself during a press conference he held in Rio de Janeiro alongside Galliani, on 6 January. The new club was unveiled five days later, as Milan officially announced Ronaldinho's move to Flamengo. At the same time, defender Oguchi Onyewu also left Milan, joining Dutch Eredivisie champions Twente on loan for the remainder of the season.

Milan went on to complete two more signings in the second half of January, bringing in Dutch duo of left winger Urby Emanuelson and midfielder Mark van Bommel, from Ajax and Bayern Munich respectively. The Rossoneri, however, made another couple of additions in the last days of the transfer window, signing Spanish left back Dídac Vilà from Espanyol and centre back Nicola Legrottaglie from Juventus.

In

Out

Out on loan

References

2010-11
Italian football clubs 2010–11 season
2010-11
2010–11 UEFA Champions League participants seasons